Ding Wei ( 966 – June 1037), courtesy name Gongyan, was a Song dynasty chancellor, who dominated the courts during Emperor Zhenzong's later reign and Emperor Renzong's early reign.

Ding Wei's opponent Wang Zeng claimed that Ding was considered one of the "Five Devils", along with Wang Qinruo, Lin Te, Chen Pengnian and Liu Chenggui, a group of high-ranking ministers unpopular at the time. In the centuries to follow, Ding Wei has almost always been portrayed as a treacherous minister in popular fiction.

Early career
Ding Wei once wrote a prose essay with his friend Sun He that quite impressed Wang Yucheng, a leading literati. Wang Yucheng considered their writing the best in China since Han Yu and Liu Zongyuan almost two centuries ago. In 992, Ding Wei passed the imperial examination and became the controller-general of Raozhou. A year later, he accompanied the crown prince Zhao Yuankan to inspect Fujian. Upon his return, he presented a report on salt and tea, and was made fiscal commissioner.

Notes and references

 
 

960s births
1037 deaths
Song dynasty chancellors
Song dynasty politicians from Jiangsu
Politicians from Suzhou